Gymnastics events were competed at the 2018 South American Games in Cochabamba, Bolivia, from May 26 to June 8, 2018.

Participating nations

Medal summary

Artistic gymnastics

Rhythmic gymnastics

Trampoline

Medal table

References

External links
 2018 South American Games – Artistic gymnastics 
 2018 South American Games – Rhythmic gymnastics 
 2018 South American Games – Trampoline 

2018 South American Games events
South American Games
2018 South American Games
2018 South American Games